Tung Chung Central is one of the 10 constituencies in the Islands District of Hong Kong.

Created for the 2019 District Council elections, the constituency sends one district councilor to the Islands District Council, with an election every four years.

Tung Chung Central loosely covers area surrounding private residential flats in central Tung Chung. It has an estimated population of 20,712.

Councillors represented

Election results

2010s

References

Tung Chung
Constituencies of Hong Kong
Constituencies of Islands District Council
2019 establishments in Hong Kong
Constituencies established in 2019